Hugh Van Lynden Otter-Barry  (7 March 1887 – 9 May 1971), was the son of Isabel Louisa née Wolryche-Whitmore (1847–1905) and Robert Melvil Barry Otter, later Otter-Barry (1845–1917), and great-grandson of William Otter, Bishop of Chichester. He was Bishop of Mauritius from 1931 to 1959.

He was educated at Marlborough and Trinity College, Cambridge. Ordained in 1910 he was initially a Curate at St Luke's Church, Chelsea and then a missionary priest in Queensland. From 1919 until 1926 he was Vicar of Brill and then began a long period of service to Mauritius — firstly as its Archdeacon; and then from 1931 as its diocesan bishop. He was consecrated a bishop on St Barnabas' Day 1931 (11 June), by Cosmo Lang, Archbishop of Canterbury, at St Paul's Cathedral. He returned to England in 1959 where he continued to serve the Church as an Assistant Bishop within the Diocese of Peterborough until his death.

A primary school in Mauritius, in the town of Curepipe, close to Farquhar Street, is named after Otter-Barry.

References

1887 births
People educated at Marlborough College
Alumni of Trinity College, Cambridge
Archdeacons of Mauritius
20th-century Anglican bishops in Africa
Anglican bishops of Mauritius
Commanders of the Order of the British Empire
1971 deaths
Anglican missionaries in Australia
English Anglican missionaries
British Mauritius people